Fractured is the fifth studio album by Lunatic Soul. The album was released on October 6, 2017 by Kscope.

Background 
Fractured marks a shift away from sounds and styles explored on previous Lunatic Soul releases. Mariusz Duda commented on the album shortly after its release:

The album was recorded and released following the death of both Riverside co-founder and guitarist Piotr Grudziński as well as Duda's father in 2016. In contrast to the previous Lunatic Soul album Walking on a Flashlight Beam, described by Duda in 2017 as one of the darkest albums he had ever recorded, Fractured has been described as more 'positive' than previous releases. Duda has stated that the main theme of Fractured is 'coming back to life after a personal tragedy', and that he wanted to create an album with a positive undertone which would suggest how to cope with loss, as well as inspire to overcome fear. He has also stated that in addition to reconciliation of loss, Fractured also deals with societal and social media division in an era of political movements such as the election of Donald Trump, Brexit, and Catalan secession.

During the writing process, Duda scrapped over thirty minutes of music initially written in the same style as previous Lunatic Soul albums, including a long intro track and several ballads, after deciding that he instead wanted to create music he felt was more powerful, self-confident and dynamic. Writing album opener "Blood on the Tightrope" served as a watershed moment for the album's composition, helping Duda set the album's more electronic tone. However Duda decided to keep two songs already recorded with the Sinfonietta Consonus Orchestra, citing the cost already spent. Under the Fragmented Sky, a supplemental album to Fractured, was released seven months later in 2018, consisting of these unreleased leftover tracks.

In a 2020 interview, Duda described how he sees Lunatic Soul's music fitting into a 'circle of life and death', with Fractured, along with the previous album Walking on a Flashlight Beam, and the end of the subsequent album Under The Fragmented Sky, falling onto the side of life due to their more electronic instrumentation.

Recording 
Fractured was mostly recorded between June 2016 and June 2017 in Serakos Studio in Warsaw, with additional recording of the Sinfonietta Consonus Orchestra for two tracks ("Crumbling Teeth and The Owl Eyes" and "A Thousand Shards of Heaven") taking place on 13 and 14 October 2016 in Custom 34 Studio in Gdańsk. In a 2017 interview, Duda stated that the idea for including an orchestra came from conversations with conductor Michal Mierzejewski, where after expressing interest in collaborate with Riverside, Duda instead proposed to collaborate on what would become Fractured. Duda later admitted that he recorded with the orchestra before he realized he wanted the direction of the album to be more electronic.

Track listing

Personnel
Credits adapted from the Lunatic Soul website.

Lunatic Soul
 Mariusz Duda - music, lyrics, keyboards, bass guitar, acoustic guitar, piccolo bass guitar, percussion, programming, lead vocals, backing vocals
Additional personnel
 Wawrzyniec Dramowicz - drums
 Marcin Odyniec - saxophone (tracks 4, 6, and 9)
 Sinfonietta Consonus Orchestra - orchestra (tracks 3 and 6)
 Michal Mierzejewski - conductor
Julia Ziętek - first violin
Karolina Gutowska - first violin
Martyna Kopiec - first violin
Judyta Sawicka - first violin
Katarzyna Libront - first violin
Paulina Kuśmierska - first violin
Magdalena Szczypińska - second violin
Karolina Janiak - second violin
Anna Gospodarek - second violin
Tomasz Chyła - second violin
Gabriela Żmigrodzka - second violin
Krzysztof Jakob Szwarc - viola
Maciej Rogoziński - viola
Ewelina Bronk-Młyńska - viola
Eliza Falkowska - viola
Weronika Kulla - cello
Alicja Różycka - cello
Katarzyna Kamińska - cello
 Damian Wdziękoński - contrabass
Joanna Kożuch - management
Production
Mariusz Duda - producer, mixing
Michał Mierzejewski - orchestral arrangements
Magda Srzednicki - producer, recording, mixing, mastering
Robert Srzednicki - producer, recording, mixing, mastering
Jakub Mańkowski - recording (orchestra)
Łukasz Kumański - recording (orchestra)
Rob Palmen - management
Design
 Travis Smith - illustration, design, layout
Oskar Szramka - photography

References

2017 albums
Kscope albums
Mystic Production albums